Street culture may refer to:

 Urban culture, the culture of towns and cities 
 Street market
 Children's street culture
 Street carnival
 Block party
 Street identity
 Street food
 Café culture
 Several youth subculture or counterculture topics pertaining to outdoors of urban centers. These can include 
 Street art
 Street dance
 Street photography
 Street wear
 Hip-hop culture
 Urban fiction
 Street sports 
 Street workout 
 Streetball
 Skateboarding
 Flatland BMX
 Parkour
 Freestyling